One Bright Day is the fourth album by Ziggy Marley and the Melody Makers, released in 1989. It won the Grammy Award for Best Reggae Album in 1990.

Track listing

Charts

Certifications

References 

Ziggy Marley and the Melody Makers albums
1989 albums
Virgin Records albums
Grammy Award for Best Reggae Album